L'Asile is a commune in the Anse-à-Veau Arrondissement, in the Nippes department of Haiti.
It has 30,240 inhabitants.

The name comes from French meaning "the asylum" probably it was used for an asylum during colonial era.

References

Populated places in Nippes
Communes of Haiti